Exosome may refer to:
 Exosome complex, an intracellular macromolecular protein complex involved in RNA degradation
 Exosome (vesicle), an extracellular vesicle released from the endosomal compartment of eukaryotic cells